Parakou Airport  is a public use airport located 1 km northwest of Parakou, Borgou, Benin. It is to be replaced by the Tourou International Airport, a new airport in Tankaro, about 10 km northwest of Parakou, which will feature an asphalt runway 3,500 meters in length. The new airport entered service on 18 March 2016.

Airlines and destinations

References

External links 
 Airport record for Parakou Airport at Landings.com

Airports in Benin
Borgou Department